Heghine Grigorian (born 1989) or Egine or Ezhine, is an Armenian-Russian singer and songwriter who's based out of Miami.

Biography
Egine was born in Yerevan, Armenia and raised in Russia.She is a Russian singer,  songwriter, record producer, model, dancer. Egine inherited the gift of music on a genetic level. Her father is an accomplished Guitar player and her mother is a singer and a vocal Teacher.Her musical instruction started at the age of 7, continued through high school and saw her ultimately enroll at the Gnessin State Musical College of Pop & Jazz Arts in Moscow, Russia which She graduated with honors  Gnessin State Musical College.  
After the Championship of Performing Arts, Egine began receiving offers from production companies worldwide. And she got noticed by a production company that was based in Miami which Egine signed a contract with for 7 years. Since then her career has started in the US.

Career

Depi Evratesil 

In 2016, Grigoryan took part in Depi Evratesil (the national final organised by AMPTV to select the artist to represent Armenia in the Eurovision Song Contest 2017).

Awards and nominations

References

Իջինը՝ Արտեմ Վալտերի հետ նոր զուգերգի և առաջին անգամ հայերեն երգելու մասին

Интервью на gorabbit.ru

1989 births
Living people
Musicians from Yerevan
21st-century Armenian women singers
Armenian pop singers
Russian pop singers
Russian people of Armenian descent
21st-century Russian women singers
21st-century Russian singers